The Deir 'Alla Inscription (or Bal'am Son of Be'or Inscription), known as KAI 312, was discovered during a 1967 excavation in Deir 'Alla, Jordan. It is currently at the Jordan Archaeological Museum. It is written in a peculiar Northwest Semitic dialect, and has provoked much debate among scholars and had a strong impact on the study of Canaanite and Aramaic inscriptions.
The Deir Alla inscription describes Bal'am in a manner which differs from that given in the Book of Numbers. Bal'am's god is associated with the goddess Ashtar, a god named Shgr, and "Shaddayin" (שדין, perhaps meaning gods and goddesses). It also features the word "Elohin" (perhaps with different vowels, like "ilāhīn"), taken to mean "gods" in the plural rather than the Hebrew deity.

The Oxford Handbook of Biblical Studies describes it as "the oldest example of a book in a West Semitic language written with an alphabet, and the oldest piece of Aramaic literature." Though containing some features of Aramaic, such as the word bar "(son of [Beor])" rather than the Canaanite ben, it also has many elements of Canaanite languages, leading some to believe it was written in a dialect of Canaanite rather than an early form of Aramaic. The inscription has been dated to 880–770 BCE. It was painted in ink on fragments of a plastered wall; red and black inks were used, red apparently to emphasize certain parts of the text. In all, 119 pieces of ink-inscribed plaster were recovered. The wall, near the summit of the tel, was felled by a tremor.

Translation and reconstruction
The text in modern Hebrew letters is available online. The text is difficult to read and to interpret. Here is one reconstruction and translation of the text:

 [This is the inscrip]tion of [Bala]am [son of Be]or. He was a divine seer, and the Gods came to him at night. [And they spoke to]
 him according to the vision of El, and they said to [Bala]am, son of Beor:  "This will the [ ... ] do in the future, no man has [seen what you have he]ard."
 And Balaam rose on the morrow, [ ... ] days [ ... ] and on the [ ... ] day [ ... ] and truly 
 he wept! And his people came to him, [and they said] to Balaam, son of Beor: "Why do you fast? Why do you weep?" And he sa-
-id to them: "Be seated, and I will show you what the Sha[ddayin have done,] and go, behold the workings of the Elo[h]in! The Elo[h]in have joined forces,
 and the Shaddayin have established a council, and they have said to Sha[gar-we-Ishtar]: "Sew up and cover the heavens in dense cloud, so that darkness, and not brilliance, will be the-
 -re, concealment, and not bristling (light?), that you may instill dread. [ ... ] darkness, and never raise your voice again!" For the swift crane will shriek in-
 -sult to the eagle, and the voice of vultures will resound [ ... ] Distress and trouble! The chicks of the heron, sparrow, and cluster of eagles,
 pigeons and birds of [ ... ] and [ ... ] a rod, where there are ewes, there shall be brought the staff. Hares – feed 
 together! Free[ly ... ] drink, asses and hyenas! Hear the admonition, adversaries of Sha-
 [-gar-we-Ishtar! ... ] To skilled diviners you shall be taken, and an oracle, a perfumer of myrrh, and a priestess,
 [ ... ] to one wearing a belt. One augurer after another, and yet another! O[ne]
 [augurer ... ] and give heed to incantations from afar!
 [ ... ] And all beheld acts of restraint. Shagar-we-Ishtar did not 
 [ ... ] The piglet [ ... ] the leopard, the [ ... ] caused the young of the [ ... ] to flee. [ ... ] two girded, and [ ... ] beheld [ ... ] 
 [ ... ] 

A more recent and complete English translation can also be found online.

The second inscription is translated thusly:

 [ ... ]
 [ ... ]
 [ ... ]
 [ ... ]
 [ ... ] satisfies
 El, lovemaking. And El built an eternal home, a hou[se ... a house ... ]
 a house which no travelers enter, nor does a bridegroom, [a house ... ]
 as wormrot from a grassy grave. From the reckless affairs of man, and from the lustful desires [ ... ]
 to me? If it is for counsel, no one will consult you! Or, for his advice, no one will take counsel! He breaks [ ... ]
 [From] the bed, they cover themselves with a wrap. One, behold, you hate him! He will become mortally ill, behold, you [ ... ] 
 punishment, [and wormrot] under your head, you shall lie on your eternal bed. To pass away to [ ... ]
 [ ... ] all [ ... ] in their heart! The corpse moans in his heart! He moans [ ... ]
 daughter. There, kings shall behold Bal[ ... ] There is no compassion when Mot seizes an infant! And an infant [ ... ]
 An infant [ ... ] there [ ... ] shall endure, the heart of the corpse is desolate as he approaches [Sheol ... ]
 To the edge of She[ol ... ] and the shadow of the hedge [ ... ] The quest of the king becomes his moth, and the q[ue]st of [ ... ]
 [ ... ] and [ ... ] seers. Your quest has become dis[tant] from you! Why [ ... ] 
 To know how to deliver an oracle to his people, you have been condemned for what you have said, and banned from pronouncing words of execration.
 [ ... ] 
 [ ... ] 
 [ ... ] 
 [ ... ]

See also
 List of artifacts in biblical archaeology

References

Bibliography
 Dijkstra, Meindert, "Is Balaam Also Among the Prophets?" Journal of Biblical Literature 114/1 (1995), 43–64.
 Hackett, Jo Ann, The Balaam Text from Deir 'Alla,  HSM 31 (Chico, CA: Scholars, 1984).
 Hoftijzer, J. and G. van der Kooij, G.,  Aramaic Texts from Deir ‘Alla (Leiden: Brill, 1976).
 Hoftijzer, J. and G. van der Kooij, G., ed., The Balaam Text from Deir 'Alla Re-evaluated: Proceedings of the International Symposium Held at Leiden, 21–24 August 1989, (Leiden:  Brill, 1991).
 Puech, E. "L'inscription sur pl tre de Tell Deir  Alla," in Biblical Archaeology Today: Proceedings of the International Congress on Biblical Archaeology Jerusalem, April 1984, ed. by J. Amitai (Jerusalem: IES, 1985), 354–65.
 Weippert, Manfred, "The Balaam Text from Deir 'Alla and the Study of the Old Testament," pp. 151–84 in The Balaam Text from Deir 'Alla Re-evaluated: Proceedings of the International Symposium Held at Leiden, 21–24 August 1989, (Leiden:  Brill, 1991).
 McCarter Jr., P. Kyle, "The Balaam Texts from Deir 'Alla: The First Combination",Bulletin of the Schools of Oriental Research 239 (1980): 49–60
 Naveh, J. "The Date of the Deir 'Alla Inscription in Aramaic Script", Israel Exploration Journal 17 (1967): 236–38.

9th-century BC inscriptions
8th-century BC inscriptions
1967 archaeological discoveries
Ancient Near East steles
Phoenician inscriptions
KAI inscriptions
Archaeological artifacts